Josef Shaftel (1919–1999) was an American film producer, director and writer.

Selected credits

Film
The Man Who Watched Trains Go By (1952) - producer
No Place to Hide (1956) - producer, director
The Naked Hills (1956) - producer director
The Biggest Bundle of Them All (1968) - producer
The Bliss of Mrs Blossom (1968) - producer
The Last Grenade (1970) - producer
The Statue (1971) - producer
The Assassination of Trotsky (1972) - executive producer
Alice's Adventures in Wonderland (1972) - executive producer
The Spiral Staircase (1975) - executive producer
Gulliver's Travels (1977) - executive producer

Television
Straightaway (1961–1962 television series) - producer

External links

American film producers
1919 births
1999 deaths
20th-century American businesspeople